Claudia Casabianca (born 21 March 1960) is a retired professional tennis player from Argentina who played in Grand Slam tournaments in the 1970s and 1980s. At age 17, Casabianca won the girls' singles title at the 1977 US Open, becoming the first female Argentine player to win a tennis championship abroad.

Junior Grand Slam finals

Singles: 1 (1 title)

Career finals

Singles (2–1)

References

External links
 
 

Living people
1960 births
US Open (tennis) junior champions
Grand Slam (tennis) champions in girls' singles
Argentine female tennis players